Sharky & George (Original name Sharky et Georges) is a children's animated series, produced by animation studios CinéGroupe and Label 35 between 1990 and 1992. The series consisted of fifty-two 25 minute episodes, including two 12 minute editions which were sometimes aired separately. The series was later translated into English and shown in the United Kingdom on Channel 4 from 1991 to 1998.

Premise
Sharky & George is set in the underwater city of Seacago, populated by various kinds of fish. The protagonists are two fish private detectives who run their own agency. Sharky, the bigger fish, is a rather lazy pink shark with a huge nose, and wears a Humphrey Bogart-style fedora hat. George, the smaller fish, is blue with a yellow face, and is younger than Sharky. Together the two friends combat the mad plans of conquest of the many villains and gangs that are terrorizing Seacago, including Lefty Hook, Harry Flix, the three thugs: Nova, Scotia and Lox, the Piranhas, Fishy Ben Backstabber, Dr. Medusa (Dr. Jelly in English versions; mad scientist and self-proclaimed master of the world), Ray Manta and the electric Torpedo Rays, the Fish Fry Gang, and Red Lobster (Colonel Klaw in English versions; German commander of the army of Black Crab).

International presence
It was translated into English, and shown on Channel 4, Sky Channel, The Children's Channel and Cartoon Network in the United Kingdom. Sharky & George was also shown in Ireland on RTÉ Two, in France on Canal+, Antenne 2, FR3 and Canal J,in Yugoslavia on RTV Politika, in Italy on Rai Uno, Rai Due and Telepace, in San Marino on San Marino RTV, in Hungary on Magyar Televízió, in Poland on TVP 1 (dubbed), in Singapore on Channel 5 and in Spain on TVE. It was translated to Spanish from America and shown on RTP (currently named TV Perú) in Peru, Megavisión (currently named Mega) in Chile, and shown in other Latin American countries as well. In Canada, it was shown on Canal Famille and on YTV and Showcase translated in English.

The show was also shown on SABC in South Africa. The show was broadcast in Afrikaans on television along with an English simulcast broadcast on radio. The English dub of the show also aired in South Africa where it aired on M-Net as part of their children's block K-T.V. and later on Bop TV in 2001 airing on its children's block Teeny Bop.

Legacy
Four VHS cassettes were released in the late '90s, but are now out of print.

A DVD containing ten episodes of the series was released in France on 17 November 2005, but is no longer available.

Voices
 A.J. Henderson - Sharky, Lox
 Paul Hawkins - George
 Ian Finlay
 Arthur Grosser - Dr. Jake Eel, Dr. Jelly
 Jane Woods - Sarah Prawn, Bella
 Pierre Lenoir
 Terrence Labrosse
 Pauline Little
 Teddy Lee Dillon
 Mark Hellman
 Mark Camacho - Scotia
 Dean Hagopian - Narrator, Colonial Klaw, Harry Flix, Marchello de Scampi, Fishy Ben Backstabber, Nova

Broadcast UK history 
Channel 4 (4 May 1991 – 29 December 1998)
Sky Channel (1991–1996) 
The Children's Channel (1991–1995) 
Cartoon Network (1996–1998)

References

External links
Sharky & George at IMDB
Sharky & George at ClassicKidsTV.co.uk

1990s Canadian animated television series
1990 Canadian television series debuts
1992 Canadian television series endings
1990 French television series debuts
1992 French television series endings
Fictional private investigators
Animated television series about fish
Canadian children's animated comedy television series
Television shows filmed in Montreal
Channel 4 original programming
1990s French animated television series
French children's animated comedy television series
Canal+ original programming
YTV (Canadian TV channel) original programming
Animated detective television series